The USS Kitty Hawk riot was a racial conflict between white and black sailors aboard the United States Navy aircraft carrier  on the night of 12–13 October 1972, while positioned at Yankee Station off the coast of North Vietnam during the Vietnam War.

Background
In the early days of the Vietnam War, African-American service members represented less than five percent of personnel in the United States Navy. The draft enticed men of all races to enlist in the Navy as a way to avoid heavy combat. This resulted in stiff competition, allowing Navy recruiters to enlist only the top performers on the Armed Forces Qualification Test. This was known as "Qualitative Recruitment"—recruiting the "highest quality" sailors, of whom nearly all happened to be white, as the quality of the education that white candidates had received was far superior to that of the black candidates. This made it improbable for black candidates to ever really compete with their white counterparts.
 
By 1971, after President Richard Nixon sought to create an all-volunteer military and the U.S. had begun to disengage from Vietnam, the number of men drafted dramatically decreased, and demand to join the Navy decreased with it. The Navy recruitment quota fell by more than fifty percent from 1971 to 1972, which resulted in the Navy needing black men to achieve its recruitment goals.

Black men joined the Navy at a high rate, increasing their overall representation to twenty percent. Due to scoring lower on their qualification exams, blacks were more likely to be placed in less desirable jobs. Whites were often promoted to the more desirable jobs and accounted for 99% of the Navy's officers.

Racial tensions among the crew
By October 1972, the majority of the black enlisted sailors on the aircraft carrier  had been serving for less than a year. Of approximately 4,500 sailors on the ship, less than seven percent were black. Racial tensions were reportedly high on the ship. Politically, black sailors tended to support the advancement of social minorities in the Navy, views which conflicted with the obstacles they were faced with due to their lack of education. This created hostility on the ship and compounded the frustration the sailors felt from being at sea for nearly eight months.

Subic Bay 
The first racial incident occurred at Subic Bay Naval Base, in Olongapo, Philippines. Racial segregation was enforced in Olongapo – the white section was known as "The Strip," while the black section was known as "The Jungle." On the night of 8 October 1972, a fight between black and white sailors broke out at the base enlisted men's club. The situation escalated when a black sailor took to the stage and began voicing his opposition to the "white man's war" and advocating "black power", leading to a white sailor throwing a glass at the black sailor's head. The brawl spread throughout the club and ultimately was broken up by base Marines. The black sailors were told not to go back to the EM Club.

Around 12:30 am on 9 October, another incident occurred when Dwight Horton, a black airman en route to Kitty Hawk, was arrested for fighting with two white petty officers. Horton asserted that the noncommisioned officers beat him. He argued he could not fight back because his arm was in a cast. When he returned to Kitty Hawk, Horton told the other black sailors about what happened, which further agitated them.

Sampaguita Club 
On 10 October 1972, the black sailors decided to disrupt a favorite hangout of white sailors on The Strip – the Sampaguita Club – to retaliate against Horton's treatment. That night was designated "Soul Night" at the club, which was the only night black sailors were welcome. Around 9:00 pm, a petty scuffle began when a black sailor punched a white shore patrolman for tapping him on the shoulder. To keep the situation from escalating, fifteen additional shore patrolmen were summoned to monitor the club.

At around 1:00 am, ten black sailors walked on stage and began "dapping" each other  exchanging physical gestures of greeting common in African-American communities  which provoked the white sailors in the audience. As the white sailors began berating the black sailors with epithets, the black sailors in the crowd voiced their solidarity. Meanwhile, outside the club, Horton arrived and threw a punch at another shore patrolman, distracting the patrolmen standing guard. White sailors began throwing beer bottles at the black sailors on stage, resulting in another brawl between black and white sailors that was again broken up by base Marines.

The following morning the sailors returned to Kitty Hawk, bloodied and bruised from the previous night, and the ship went to sea.

Incident
On the afternoon of 12 October, while Kitty Hawk was participating in Operation Linebacker off the coast of North Vietnam, three black sailors went on deck. The three were approached by two Marines who told them, "You blacks can't walk in over twos." When the black sailors ignored them and kept walking, one of the Marines used a nightstick to put one of the sailors, Perry Pettus, into a stranglehold. When Captain Marland Townsend Jr. of Kitty Hawk learned of the incident, he apologized to the three black sailors. Word of the incident made its rounds among black sailors, who were already incensed by events at Subic Bay.

Thirty minutes after flight operations, one of those black sailors, 18-year-old black Airman Apprentice Terry Avinger, went to the mess deck to eat and requested two sandwiches. A white mess cook refused and limited Avinger to one sandwich. Avinger then reached across the food line and took another sandwich, which resulted in a shouting match between him and the mess cook. Things escalated after another white mess cook, organizing food trays, stepped on a black sailor's foot.

Upset about what transpired, Avinger went to a bunk area where black sailors regularly got together and expressed his frustration about the way they were being subjugated by whites on the ship, telling them he regretted "that he didn't just beat the racist cracker's ass right there." He railed that "black sailors on the Kitty Hawk had had enough and it was time to stand up for themselves." The black sailors then went into the ship's passageway and armed themselves with makeshift weapons – broom handles, wrenches, a foam fog nozzle and pieces of pipe. They then began beating white sailors and vandalized some of the ship's compartments.

Around 8:00 p.m., a white cook called for the Marine detachment on board. When the white Marines arrived, they ordered the black sailors to the aft mess. The black sailors thought that the Marines were corralling them there in order to beat or kill them. This resulted in a stand-off between the two groups.

Deescalation 
News of what was happening reached Kitty Hawks half‐black/half‐Native executive officer, Commander Ben Cloud, who had been aboard the ship for eight weeks. Informed that the situation was potentially deadly, Cloud went on the ship's communication system and ordered the violence to stop, pleading for the black sailors to go to the aft mess and for the Marines to stand down and go to the forecastle. Cloud was unaware that Captain Townsend had also been briefed on what was happening and was on his way to the mess deck.

Cloud went to the mess deck to talk to the black sailors for about an hour, trying to calm them down and assure them that he could be trusted: "For the first time, you have a brother who is an executive officer. My door is always open." Their anger subsiding, the black sailors gave a Black Power salute in solidarity to Cloud, who returned the salute. The black sailors celebrated, feeling that they had someone in a position of authority who was sympathetic to their treatment on board. Cloud then dismissed the sailors and told them to get back to work. Townsend arrived on the mess deck and, witnessing Cloud's handling of the situation, disagreed with his method. He left the mess deck and summoned the Marine detachment, ordering them to increase patrols in the black compartments.

Despite the de-escalation, tensions were still high. Groups of between five and twenty-five black sailors continued to roam Kitty Hawk, attacking whites at random throughout the night. Sleeping sailors were pulled from their racks and beaten with fists, chains, wrenches and broom handles, with many also shouting epithets such as, "Kill the white trash!” The mess cook who had earlier confronted Avinger was found and beaten after a mock trial. Cloud again intervened when he saw some black sailors heading to the forecastle, where the Marines had been ordered to go. By Cloud's own admission, "he believed that had he not been black he would have been killed on the spot." Cloud talked to the sailors for two hours, appealing to them not as a senior officer but "as one black to another."

By 2:30 am, Cloud had calmed the black sailors and persuaded them to relinquish their weapons. About forty sailors went to the mess deck to eat, play cards and listen to music along with a few white sailors. At 3:00 a.m., Townsend told Cloud he did not want large groups of blacks congregating in the mess hall, and likened the gathering to a "victory party." Townsend and Cloud dispersed the group and met with any sailors who were still upset in the forecastle until 5:00 a.m.

Many white sailors aboard the massive ship were unaware that the incident had occurred, and began to hear rumors when they awoke. Becoming increasingly angry, about 150 white sailors began to arm themselves and congregated in a berthing compartment, readying themselves for what they thought would be an outright racial battle for control of Kitty Hawk. Hearing of the discord, Cloud went to address the group, who dismissed him as being "nothing more than a nigger, like the rest of them." When Cloud pulled rank on them and threatened them with legal action if they proceeded, the white sailors dispersed. Cloud reported the incident to Townsend and then continued to talk to concerned sailors – both white and black – throughout the morning, reducing the threat of white retaliation.

By 7:58 a.m., the confrontation had completely ended, and the Kitty Hawk resumed bombing North Vietnam.

In total, the incident left forty white sailors and six black sailors injured, including three who had to be evacuated to onshore medical facilities.

Courts-martial
Six weeks after the incident, Kitty Hawk returned to San Diego, California, where twenty-seven black sailors were arrested and charged. No white sailors were arrested. Twenty-one of those charged requested a court martial trial.

Lawyers for the black sailors stressed the bias shown in the pre-trial report against the black sailors, stating that it only contained testimony from prosecution witnesses. By December, Congress had begun investigating the incident and called Townsend and Cloud to testify. Most of those who requested a court martial were also invited to testify, but they all declined and no subpoenas were issued to force them to do so.

In January 1973, before a Navy court-martial, Cloud testified that the fighting erupted when Marines, on orders to break up groups of three or more sailors, only enforced the order against black sailors. He further testified that he had been threatened by black and white sailors alike, and that during the fighting between black sailors and Marines he witnessed a white sailor seemingly directing Marines toward black sailors. He noted that Townsend requested that the white sailor be identified, "but this was not done."

In February, on behalf of seventeen of the black sailors, the National Association for the Advancement of Colored People (NAACP) brought a complaint against a prosecutor for racial prejudice in an attempt to get the charges against the black sailors dismissed. The complaint also accused Michael A. Laurie, a white sailor who had been a key government witness, for perjury. Citing tape recordings of Laurie admitting that white sailors had "exaggerated" the violence of black sailors; then later affirming that he had lied about black sailors when he was asked outright. Laurie elaborated that, despite not seeing any black sailors actually hit any white sailors, white sailors would say that they did. Laurie also demonstrated racist leanings when he expressed his regret for not being armed on the night of the riot since it would have allowed him to have killed "at least 30 of them [black sailors]."

In April 1973, the courts martial concluded with a total of twenty-seven trials.

Aftermath
The events on Kitty Hawk inspired other ship riots and protests in the months that followed. In October, around the same time as the events aboard Kitty Hawk, a series of isolated interracial attacks occurred aboard . On November 3, as Constellation was sailing toward San Diego, black sailors staged a sit-down strike in the enlisted men's mess deck. The strike was chaotic, but one central grievance was that six black sailors were to be given general discharges rather than honorable discharges. Captain Ward avoided meeting directly with the men because, according to a public relations officer, that would have implied a "recognition of some sort of union" and a "breakdown of the chain of command." Seaman Edward A. Martinez was elected as a representative, but attempts at mediation with an officer, Commander Yacabucci, did not succeed in defusing the situation. At the dock in San Diego on Nov. 4, there was another sit-down protest, and 120 sailors who did not return to the ship were charged with being ashore without leave, receiving light punishments. The Navy avoided describing the events as a mutiny.

The Navy officially defined the incident aboard Kitty Hawk as a race riot. However, only four sailors were convicted of rioting, with two of those pleading guilty in exchange for reduced sentences. Fourteen were convicted of assault. Four were found not guilty of all charges. Five sailors had the charges dropped against them, and seven were sentenced to the brig. Most were given a demotion in rank.

Roy Wilkins, executive director of the NAACP, called the Navy's handling of the incident a "despicable perversion of justice" of the black sailors who were victims of "a spurious effort to discredit them, categorize them, and keep them in menial, low-paying jobs." Many black officers also expressed that the riot was inevitable because the Navy was inept at treating black sailors as sailors rather than as blacks, which created differences in the way black sailors were treated over issues such as "promotion, assignments, interracial relationships." However, despite these accounts, Floyd Hicks, the Chairman of the House Armed Services Subcommittee, determined that the incident "consisted of unprovoked attacks" by blacks against whites.

The subcommittee wrote that "the riot on Kitty Hawk consisted of unprovoked assaults by a very few men, most of whom were below-average mental capacity, most of whom had been aboard for less than one year, and all of whom were black. This group, as a whole, acted as 'thugs' which raises doubt as to whether they should ever have been accepted into military service in the first place." The Subcommittee's final report concluded:

The subcommittee has been unable to determine any precipitous cause for rampage aboard U.S.S. Kitty Hawk. Not only was there not one case wherein racial discrimination could be pinpointed, but there is no evidence which indicated that the blacks who participated in that incident perceived racial discrimination, either in general or any specific, of such a nature as to justify belief that violent reaction was required ... The members of the subcommittee did not find and are unaware of any instances of institutional discrimination on the part of the Navy toward any group of persons, majority or minority ... Black unity, the drive toward togetherness on the part of blacks, has resulted in a tendency on the part of black sailors to polarize. This results in a grievance of one black, real or fancied, becoming the grievance of many ... The Navy's recruitment program for most of 1972 which resulted in the lowering of standards for enlistment, accepting a greater percentage of mental category IV and those in the lower half of category III, not requiring recruits in these categories to have completed their high school education, and accepting these people without sufficient analysis of their previous offense records, has created many of the problems the Navy is experiencing today.

See also
 1941 Harvard–Navy lacrosse game—lacrosse game in which the Navy team would not play against an integrated team
 African American opposition to United States involvement in the Vietnam War
 Golden Thirteen—first African American commissioned and warranted officers in the U.S. Navy 
 Military history of African Americans
 Port Chicago disaster—munitions explosion whose subsequent trial highlighted racial inequality in the Navy
 Racism against African Americans in the U.S. military

Citations

References

External links

1972 in the United States
1972 riots
History of African-American civil rights
African-American history of the United States military
Cold War military history of the United States
Politics and race in the United States
Discrimination in the United States
African-American history by location
1972 in Vietnam
African-American riots in the United States
White American riots in the United States
Mutinies in the United States Navy
United States Navy in the Vietnam War
United States Navy in the 20th century
Riots and civil disorder in the United States
October 1972 events in Asia
Events that led to courts-martial